Rocknroll Blitzkrieg Records was an independent record label from Berkeley, California, that put out Garage rock music.

History
Mark Murrmann founded the label in the late 1990s while working at Maximumrocknroll magazine. At MRR he was exposed to a high volume of garage rock bands. Murrmann vouched to only sign bands “great enough to be on a label boldly called Rocknroll Blitzkrieg.”  Every record they put out was in vinyl form. In 2003, Murrmann folded the company and decided to focus on his career in photography.

Artists
Henry Fiats Open Sore
John Wilkes Booze
The Piranhas
The Static
The Upskirts
Welfare
X

References

External links 
 Rocknroll Blitzkrieg Records at Grunnenrocks

Companies established in the 1990s
Companies based in Berkeley, California
American independent record labels
Punk record labels
Garage rock record labels